Henry Canova Vollam Morton  (known as H. V. Morton), (26 July 1892 – 18 June 1979) was a journalist and pioneering travel writer from Lancashire, England. He was best known for his many books on London, Great Britain and the Holy Land. He first achieved fame in 1923 when, while working for the Daily Express, he covered the opening of the tomb of Tutankhamun by Howard Carter.

Life

Early life
Morton was born at Ashton-under-Lyne, Lancashire, on 26 July 1892, the son of Joseph Morton, editor of the Birmingham Mail, and Margaret Maclean Ewart. He was educated at King Edward's School in Birmingham but left at the age of 16 to pursue a career in journalism. He served in the Warwickshire Yeomanry during World War I, but saw no combat action. He married Dorothy Vaughton (born 1887) on 14 September 1915. They had three children, Michael, Barbara and John. They later divorced, and on 4 January 1934, he married Violet Mary Muskett (née Greig, born 1900, known as Mary). They had a son, Timothy.

Later life
In the late 1940s Morton, and Violet, emigrated to the Union of South Africa, settling near Cape Town in Somerset West. He later became a South African citizen, and remained a permanent resident until his death in 1979. Morton and his son were survived by Mary.

Journalism
Morton's journalism career began in 1910 at the Birmingham Gazette and Express, where his father was an editor. Two years later, he was promoted to an assistant editor; and relocated to London for most of his British career.  His first position in London was as a sub-editor for the Daily Mail. 

After his military service during First World War, he returned to London, working at  the Evening Standard in 1919–21, and from 1921 on the Daily Express. His columns on London life in the latter were popular among readers.

Morton also gave readings of his work on BBC radio.

Tomb of Tutankhamun

In 1923 the Daily Express sent Morton to Egypt to cover the excavation of Tutankhamun's tomb. Morton was able to provide an eye witness account of the opening of the inner burial chamber containing the sarcophagus of Tutankhamun, circumventing The Times exclusive rights to the story. A day after the opening, the discovery was reported in the Daily Express:

His widely-read articles on the excavation helped establish Morton's reputation as a journalist and were a boon to the popularity of his travel writing and journalism. Between 1931 and 1942, he was "special writer" at the Daily Herald. In 1941, he was a reporter at the Atlantic Charter between Winston Churchill and Franklin D. Roosevelt, which later became the subject of his book Atlantic Meeting, published 1943.

Travel writing
Morton's first book, The Heart of London, appeared in 1925, which developed his popular Daily Express columns. This was followed by two further collections of his writings on London, in The Spell of London (1926), and Nights of London (1926). In 1926 he wrote a series of articles for the Daily Express based on his travels around England in his bull-nosed Morris car. The series was entitled In Search of England and the vignettes were later adapted into the book of the same name. This became a bestseller and the first of his many In Search of... books.

Morton's first foreign travel book, In the Steps of the Master (1934), was well received and sold over half a million copies. The Master of the title was Jesus, and the book was an account of Morton's travels in the Holy Land. This was soon followed by In the Steps of St. Paul (1936), and describes Turkey 13 years after the Turkish War of Independence and its founding as a modern state. This was followed by Through Lands of the Bible (1938) in which he visits Egypt, Palestine, Syria and Iraq. Extracts from all three books were combined and published as Middle East during World War II for British servicemen stationed in the Middle East.

In addition to Atlantic Meeting (1941), Morton wrote two books describing England and the War, including collection of essays on London in  The Ghosts of London (1939), I Saw Two Englands (1942), and I, James Blunt describing England after the Nazi victory, being fictional propaganda for the British Government. A full-length history of London, (In Search of London) (1951), includes a post-war examination of bombing damage inflicted on London during The Blitz. After the war, South Africa was the subject of In Search of South Africa (1948), and shortly afterwards he and his wife emigrated there. During the mid-1950s and 60s he wrote books on Spain and Italy. A Traveller in Italy is situated in Northern Italy, while A Traveller in Southern Italy explores the poorer provinces of the south.

Honours
Morton became a Fellow of the Royal Society of Literature (FRSL). Greece made him a Commander of the Order of the Phoenix in 1937 and he was awarded the Order of Merit of the Italian Republic in 1965. A commemorative blue plaque was erected in Ashton-under-Lyne (Morton's birthplace) in June 2004.

Controversy
A controversial biography by Michael Bartholomew, based on Morton's private and public writings, titled In Search of H. V. Morton, was published by Methuen in 2004. According to Bartholomew, based on Morton's private memoirs and diaries, Morton was privately a Nazi sympathizer. In a diary entry from February 1941, he confessed: "I must say Nazi-ism has some fine qualities" and, "I am appalled to discover how many of Hitler's theories appeal to me". In another entry, he described the United States as "that craven nation of Jews and foreigners".

Publications
Morton was a prolific writer, with a body of work consisting of several hundred newspaper, magazine articles and features, in addition to his published books.

References

External links
 
 "A very English hypocrite" Max Hastings reviews in Search of H. V. Morton by Michael Bartholomew
 Website and HV Morton Society

1892 births
1979 deaths
British male journalists
British travel writers
People from Ashton-under-Lyne
Fellows of the Royal Society of Literature
English emigrants to South Africa
People educated at King Edward's School, Birmingham
Warwickshire Yeomanry officers
Commanders of the Order of the Phoenix (Greece)
Recipients of the Order of Merit of the Italian Republic
BBC radio presenters